Early Indians: The Story of Our Ancestors and Where We Came From is a 2018 non-fiction book written by Indian journalist Tony Joseph, that focuses on the ancestors of people living today in South Asia. Joseph goes 65,000 years into the past– when anatomically modern humans (Homo sapiens), first made their way from Africa into the Indian subcontinent. The book relies on research findings from six major disciplines - history, archaeology, linguistics, population genetics, philology and epigraphy, and includes path-breaking ancient DNA research of recent years. The book also relies on the extensive study titled "The Genomic Formation of Central and South Asia", co-authored by 92 scientists from around the world and co-directed by geneticist David Reich of Harvard Medical School, in which ancient DNA was used. The book was later released in different languages like Tamil, Hindi, Oriya, Telugu, Marathi, Malayalam, Gujarati etc.

Description
The book discusses four prehistoric migrations in India. The book posits that the  Harappans were a mixture of Zagros agriculturists (from the modern-day Iran area) and First Indians, a wave of migrants who came from Africa into Arabia and then reached India around 65,000 years ago. Citing recent DNA evidence, the book traces the subsequent large migrations of anatomically modern humans into India—of agriculturalists from Iran between 7000 and 3000 BCE and Indo-European languages speaking pastoralists from the Central Asian Steppe (Aryans) between 2000 and 1000 BCE, among others. Joseph uses the layers of a pizza as a metaphor to explain the make-up of subcontinental society. 

The book also discusses about similarities and differences between Indus Valley civilization and early Vedic civilization. The book mentions that "Aryan" culture was most likely the result of interaction, adoption and adaptation among those who brought Indo-European languages to India and those who were already well-settled inhabitants of the region, and that Sanskrit and the Vedas developed in the Indian subcontinent. According to Joseph, Proto-Dravidian is related to the Elamitic language of Iran. The caste system in India is a recent social system, reflected in sharply reduced inter-marriage (endogamy) and genetic mixing after 100 AD. This book also takes into account the path-breaking DNA research and findings from geneticist David Reich's research.

Reception
The book was well received by readers and many critics. Sujatha Byravan wrote in The Hindu that the book tells a compelling story of our forefathers based on genetic evidence. Razib Khan opined that the book presents a clear understanding of Early Indians. Swaminathan Aiyar of The Times of India thought that the book helps us understand how all Indians have African, Harappan and Steppe Asian genes in different doses. Author Gurcharan Das said that the book helps us understand that Indians are composed of a large number of small populations. Kesavan Veluthat of The Hindu stated that the book shows a firm basis on which the study of Indian history can begin. This is of especial importance in the context of the post-truth conditions of the present, when myth-making seeks to replace authentic knowledge. In June 2019, leading Indian geneticists from the Centre for Cellular and Molecular Biology (CCMB), Hyderabad reviewed Early Indians book in reputed science journal Current Science and appreciated Tony Joseph for synthesizing the chronology of movement of modern human into the Indian subcontinent from the first Out of-Africa humans to recent migrants, citing the new findings from the fields of archaeology, anthropology, linguistics and genetics (including ancient DNA). Nobel Prize winning structural biologist Venki Ramakrishnan described the book as a "very readable account".

Awards
 Best non-fiction books of the decade (2010-2019) - The Hindu
 Book of the Year Award (non-fiction), Tata Literature Live, 2019 - The Wire
 Shakti Bhatt First Book Prize 2019 - The Indian Express
 Atta Galatta Award for best Non-Fiction, 2019 - Deccan Herald
 One of the 10 Best New Prehistory Books To Read In 2020, as identified by bookauthority

See also
 The Horse, the Wheel, and Language - 2007 book by anthropologist David W. Anthony 
 Proto-Indo-European language
 Peopling of India
 Haplogroup R1a
 Shahr-e Sukhteh
 Who We Are and How We Got Here - 2018 book by David Reich (geneticist) 
 Bactria–Margiana Archaeological Complex
 Recent African origin of modern humans

References

External links
 Early Indians: The Story of Our Ancestors and Where We Came From at Amazon

Human evolution books
Last common ancestors
2018 non-fiction books
Genetics books
Human population genetics
Juggernaut Books books